Ysgol John Bright is a secondary school on Maesdu Road, Llandudno in Conwy County Borough, Wales. It was founded with money and support from the social reformer John Bright, whose son died in Llandudno in 1864. Until 1969 the school was a selective grammar school  known as John Bright Grammar School (JBGS). It reopened in September  1969 as   a comprehensive and with a new name – Ysgol John Bright. ("Ysgol" is  Welsh for "school")  The school serves the state secondary education sector in the Llandudno area and has around 1200 pupils. The current headteacher is Hywel Parry.

The first John Bright school first opened in February 1896 in  temporary premises – now the Risboro Hotel. It was bought for £567 and had 62 pupils. By 1905, there were nearly 80 pupils and 5 teachers. It had five classrooms and specialist rooms for cookery, music, art and woodwork, physics and science.
The headmaster was J.M. Archer-Thomson, a leading Welsh mountaineer.

The school  moved to a new site on Oxford Road  in  1907 and remained on that site  until 2004. 
The Oxford Road  buildings were demolished in 2004 and the site was redeveloped as an Asda store. It has not been revealed how much Asda paid for the site.  New school buildings on Maesdu Road were opened in September 2004. They were built as part of a PFI project and a facilities management company handles caretaking, cleaning and catering. The cost was £20,000,000.   
As the new site had previously been a landfill and gasworks, the move was the subject of some controversy.

Examinations
The school offers education for KS3, KS4 and Post-16 students. It offers GCSE, Entry Level examinations for KS4 and AS-level and A-level for Post-16 education. The school is well known for its exceptional sports facilities. The school performs a different musical production each year.

Notable former pupils

Sheila Collins OBE, British nurse and educationist.
Joey Jones, Footballer, Liverpool Defender.
Keith Mason, Astronomer, Chief Executive of the Science and Technology Facilities Council (STFC) of the United Kingdom from 2007 to 2011.
Sir Gareth Gwyn Roberts, 1958 Penmaenmawr. Physics. President of Wolfson College, Oxford University, UK.
Neville Southall. Football. Everton Goalkeeper.
 Roger Roberts, Baron Roberts of Llandudno - former President of the Welsh Liberal Democrats and Methodist Minister
 Gordon Borrie, Baron Borrie - Lawyer.  Evacuated to Llandudno during World War II.
 Catfish and the Bottlemen - Rock band.

References

External links
 Ysgol John Bright website

Secondary schools in Conwy County Borough
Educational institutions established in 1896
Llandudno
1896 establishments in Wales